Nilesat (or ) is an Egyptian company and the name of a series of Egyptian communications satellites. It was established in 1996 with the purpose of operating Egyptian satellites and their associated mission control center and ground stations. The company is owned by the Egyptian Radio & Television Union with a 40 per cent share, the Arab Organization for Industrialization with a 10 per cent share, the Egyptian Company for Investment Projects with a 9 per cent share and the rest is owned by the general public, Egyptian financial institutions and other investors. The company has two ground stations, a primary one in 6th of October City and a secondary ground station in Alexandria. The two ground stations were built by EADS Astrium.  Nilesat operates multiple geosynchronous communications satellites, all of which are stationed at 7 degrees West. Nilesat includes as of 17 April 2022 1091 video channels, most of which are free-to-air.

Nilesat 101 

Nilesat 101 was launched by an Ariane 4 rocket from Kourou, French Guiana on 28 April 1998 at 22:53:00 UTC by the European Space Agency. It was manufactured by the European company Matra Marconi Space (Astrium) and started official broadcasting on 31 May 1998. The satellite had an expected lifetime of 12 years. At launch, the spacecraft had a Gross Liftoff Weight (GLOW) of 1,666 kg, which means it is loaded with propellant.

Nilesat 102 

Nilesat 102 was launched by an Ariane 44LP rocket from Kourou, French Guiana on 17 August 2000 at 23:16 UTC by the European Space Agency. It was manufactured by the European company Matra Marconi Space (Astrium), and started official broadcasting on 12 September 2000. The satellite had an expected lifetime of 15 years. At launch, the spacecraft had a Gross Liftoff Weight (GLOW) of 1,827 kg.

Nilesat 103 

Nilesat 103 satellite is a leased communications satellite. Nilesat and Eutelsat agreed in September 2005 to lease capacity on Eutelsat's Hot Bird 4 satellite after relocating it to 7° West and renaming it Nilesat 103. The satellite has been repositioned to this location in the second quarter of 2006 after the launch and entry into service of Eutelsat's Hot Bird 7A and Hot Bird 8 satellites.

Nilesat 103 joined its two existing sister satellites Nilesat 101 and Nilesat 102 in providing Direct Broadcast Satellite (Direct to Home or DTH) digital TV channels, data transmission, turbo internet and multicasting applications to more than 15 million viewers in the North African and Middle East region. In April 2009 the satellite has been repositioned to 16° East as Eurobird 16. The orbital slot at 7° West has been replaced with the new Hot Bird 10, known as Atlantic Bird 4A.

Nilesat 201 

Nilesat selected Thales Alenia Space of France and Italy in May 2008 to build the Nilesat 201  satellite, which was launched on 4 August 2010 aboard a European Ariane 5 rocket.

The Nilesat 201 satellite, which was launched into Nilesat's 7° West slot, is built on the Thales Alenia Space Spacebus-4000B2 platform and weighs 3,129 kilograms. It carries 24 Ku-band transponders and four transponders in Ka-band for direct-to-home television, radio and data-transmissions in the Middle East and North Africa.

Nilesat 301 
Built by Thales Alenia Space and launched by SpaceX on 8 June 2022, the Egyptian satellite will be stationed at 7.0° west at geostationary transfer orbit.

List of providers

References

1998 establishments in Egypt
Communications satellite operators
Telecommunications companies of Egypt
Space program of Egypt
Government-owned companies of Egypt
Egyptian companies established in 1998
Telecommunications companies established in 1998
Satellite series
6th of October (city)